Konuksever can refer to:

 Konuksever, Çermik
 Konuksever, Kemah